The 1960 Detroit Lions season was the 27th in the Motor City, and 31st season overall in franchise history. The Lions had only one win entering November, but had only one loss in their final seven games and finished at 7–5, one game short of the Western Conference championship (won by Green Bay). However, the Lions won the inaugural third place Playoff Bowl over the Cleveland Browns at the Orange Bowl in Miami.

Due to (a) this being the NFL's last 12-game regular season and (b) the Dallas Cowboys giving the league 13 teams, necessitating each team have a bye during the season ,the 1960 Lions are the last NFL team which did not play its season opener until October. Detroit drew its bye during week one, which was the last week of September. 

Ironically, the next season in which each NFL team had a bye week (1966, due to addition of the Atlanta Falcons), the Lions did not have their bye until week 15.

Regular season

Schedule 

 Thursday (November 24: Thanksgiving)

Game summaries

Week 9 

    
    
    
    
    
    

Thanksgiving Day game

Standings

Roster

Playoff Bowl 
The first Playoff Bowl game for third place was played at the Orange Bowl in Miami, the week following the NFL Championship game.

Awards and records

References 

 Detroit Lions on Pro Football Reference
 Detroit Lions on jt-sw.com
 Detroit Lions on The Football Database

Detroit Lions
Detroit Lions seasons
Detroit Lions